The Terror of Cosmic Loneliness is a collaborative album by Welsh singer Gruff Rhys and Brazilian musician Tony Da Gatorra. It was released on 26 July 2010 by Turnstile Music.

Critical reception
The Terror of Cosmic Loneliness was met with "mixed or avergage" reviews from critics. At Metacritic, which assigns a weighted average rating out of 100 to reviews from mainstream publications, this release received an average score of 55 based on 8 reviews.

In a review for Drowned in Sound, Kyle Ellison wrote: "Unfortunately this doesn't make for the most coherent of listens, and for the most part this record feels half-baked. Moments of genuine inspiration are difficult to find, which is surprising considering the pair's obvious talent and intrigue. While the most fully formed song, 'In A House With No Mirrors', hints at the duo's potential, even this is fairly ordinary and the track feels incongruous with the sparser sounds found elsewhere. It's disappointing, too, that for an album with such a brilliantly evocative title, it mostly fails to create a mood that corresponds." Alex Wisgard of The Line of Best Fit stated: "The ten songs on The Terror of Cosmic Loneliness make up the strangest record Gruff Rhys has ever put his name to – this from a man whose back catalogue includes an electropop concept album about John DeLorean."

Track listing

References

2010 albums
Gruff Rhys albums